The Bristol Braemar was a British heavy bomber aircraft developed at the end of the First World War for the Royal Air Force. Only two prototypes were constructed.

Development
The prototype Braemar was developed in response to the establishment of the Independent Air Force in October 1917, as a bomber capable of the long-range bombing of Berlin if necessary. A large triplane, it had internal stowage for up to six 250 lb (110 kg) bombs.

The initial design featured an unusual engine installation with a central engine room housing all four engines. These were to be geared in pairs and power taken from the engines to the four propellers by power shafts. This design was abandoned early in development, and both the completed Braemars had a conventional engine installation, with the engines in inline tandem pairs, driving pusher and tractor propellers. However, the engine-room design was resurrected later in the Braemar's development life, for the proposed steam-powered Tramp.

A contract from the Air Board for three prototypes was awarded to Bristol & Colonial on 26 February 1918. The first prototype Braemar flew on 13 August 1918, with four  Siddeley Puma engines.

The Braemar never entered service with the RAF, and the two prototypes were the only Braemars built. The third prototype was completed as a Pullman 14-passenger civil transport.

Variants

Type 24 Braemar I
Prototype with four  Siddeley Puma engines, one built first flown 13 March 1918.
Type 25 Braemer II
Prototype with four  Liberty L-12 engines, one built first flown 18 February 1919.
 Type 26 Pullman
14-passenger civil transport variant with Liberty L-12 engines, one built first flown in May 1920.

Specifications (Braemar Mk.II)

See also

References

Citations

Bibliography
 
 

Cancelled military aircraft projects of the United Kingdom
Braemar
1910s British bomber aircraft
Four-engined push-pull aircraft
Triplanes
Aircraft first flown in 1918